The Moroccan ambassador in Beijing is the official representative of the Government in Rabat to the Government of the People's Republic of China.

History
In October 1958 Mehdi Ben Barka, then president of the Consultative Assembly of Morocco, accepted an invitation from Liu Shaoqi, chair of the standing committee of the National People's Congress, to visit China. The invitation was extended through a Chinese trade delegation visiting Morocco.

List of representatives

References 

 
China
Morocco